The Giant's Fist (German: Die Faust des Riesen) is a 1917 German silent drama film directed by Rudolf Biebrach and starring Henny Porten and Johannes Riemann.

The film's sets were designed by the art director Ludwig Kainer.

Cast
In alphabetical order
 Rudolf Biebrach as Gehrke 
 Herr Kaufmann as Malte von Malchow 
 Henny Porten as Martina von Brake 
 Auguste Pünkösdy as Gustava von Klützkow 
 Johannes Riemann as Leutnant Wend von Brake 
 Herr Schmelzer as Runzelnick 
 Eduard von Winterstein as Diether von Brake 
 Anna Elisabeth Weihrauch as Hella

References

Bibliography
 Kreimeier, Klaus. The Ufa Story: A History of Germany's Greatest Film Company, 1918-1945. University of California Press, 1999.

External links

1917 films
Films of the German Empire
German silent feature films
Films directed by Rudolf Biebrach
German drama films
1917 drama films
Films based on German novels
German black-and-white films
Silent drama films
1910s German films